The fourth season of the reality television show, Storage Wars aired on A&E from April 16, 2013 to July 2, 2013. It consisted of 22 episodes, beginning with the episode "Auctioning for Dummies" and ending with the episode "Super Bros. Shuffle".

Following the departure of Dave Hester, numerous buyers were featured this season as there was no permanent personality for the fourth featured buyer spot. This is the final season to feature for Barry Weiss.

All of the episodes this season were filmed at various self-storage facilities throughout Southern California, including Mini-U Storage, Storage Outlet and Extra Storage.

Episode overview
{|class="wikitable plainrowheaders" style="width:100%; margin:auto; background:#fff;"
|-
!  style="width:10%; background:#61B329; color:#fff;"|No. inseries 
!  style="width:10%; background:#61B329; color:#fff;"|No. inseason 
!  style="width:40%; background:#61B329; color:#fff;"|Title
!  style="width:20%; background:#61B329; color:#fff;"|Location
!  style="width:20%; background:#61B329; color:#fff;"|Original air date
!  style="width:10%; background:#61B329; color:#fff;"|U.S. viewers(millions)
|-

|}

Episode statistics
Although revealed at the end of the episode, the totals are not always reflective and exact of the value of items in the lockers. In many cases, the values of items are estimates made on the spot by the cast members, and are not necessarily actual profits or losses. Some of the episodes were not aired in the order that they were filmed. Therefore, the * column in each season's episode list indicates the sequential order of that episode.

Main buyers episode statistics

Notes
 1 Jarrod attended this auction alone.
 2 Barry teams up with Jarrod and Brandi to turn a profit.
 3 Brandi attended this auction alone.
 4 Jarrod and Brandi donated their items appraised at $400 from their unit for a good cause.
 5 Barry would have made a profit on this unit, but fell in the red when he offered all of his friends them $100 each if he could hit the "10" on his first shot on his assembled shuffleboard, which he did, thus costing him his potential profit.

Frequent buyers episode statistics

There were many frequent buyers over the course of the season. These are their results. 
Key:
- didn't appear in episode.

Notes
 1 Mark bought three units for the total price of $2,200. It was not said or revealed at the end of the episode how much profit he made.
 2 Even though Ivy Calvin didn't buy any units, he lost $300 because of a ticket for using his cell phone during driving.

References

External links
 Storage Wars Zap2it Episode List

Season 4